The Upper Colony Fire was a wildfire in Smith Valley, Nevada in the United States. The fire was started on June 17, 2018 and was contained on June 22. The fire was started by truck brakes that overheated and caught dry grass on fire.

Events
The Upper Colony Fire was reported on June 17, 2018 around 11:44 am west of Upper Colony Road in Smith Valley, Nevada. The fire, which was caused when a truck's brakes overheated and set grass on fire, was fueled by high brush and timber litter. The fire threatened properties including ranches and horse farms, greater sage-grouse habitats, and Burbank Canyons Wilderness Study Area.

References

2018 Nevada wildfires
June 2018 events in the United States
Lyon County, Nevada